Rostraria is a genus of plants in the grass family, native primarily to Eurasia and North Africa with one species native to South America. Hairgrass is a common name.

These grasses are sometimes included in genus Koeleria.

 Species
 Rostraria azorica S.Hend. - Santa Maria in Azores
 Rostraria balansae (Coss. & Durieu) Holub - Algeria incl. Habibas Islands
 Rostraria berythea (Boiss. & Blanche) Holub - Cyprus, Turkey, Lebanon, Syria, Iraq, Iran, Palestine, Jordan, Israel
 Rostraria clarkeana (Domin) Holub - 	Jammu & Kashmir
 Rostraria cristata (Linn.) Tzvelev - Mediterranean hairgrass - Mediterranean, Sahara, and southwest Asia from Portugal + Cape Verde to northern India
 Rostraria hispida (Savi) Dogan - Mediterranean from Morocco + Corsica to Turkey
 Rostraria litorea (All.) Holub - Mediterranean from Morocco + Corsica to Greece
 Rostraria obtusiflora  (Boiss.) Holub - from Crete to Tajikistan
 Rostraria pumila (Desf.) Tzvelev from Canary Islands to Pakistan
 Rostraria rohlfsii (Asch.) Holub -  Sahara (Algeria, Tunisia, Libya, Chad, Egypt)
 Rostraria salzmannii (Boiss.) Holub - Spain, Morocco, Algeria, Tunisia, Libya
 Rostraria trachyantha  (Phil.) Soreng - Peru, Chile

 formerly included
see Avellinia Trisetaria 
 Rostraria festucoides - Avellinia festucoides 
 Rostraria laevis - Trisetaria panicea  
 Rostraria neglecta - Trisetaria panicea  
 Rostraria parviflora - Trisetaria parviflora

References

Pooideae
Poaceae genera